Igor Miladinović (born 25 January 1974) is a Serbian chess grandmaster.

Miladinović won the 1993 World Junior Chess Championship and at the end of the year was declared athlete of the Year in FR Yugoslavia (Serbia and Montenegro). In 1994 he played for FR Yugoslavia in the Moscow Olympiad, winning a bronze medal on 4th board. Around 1995 he moved to Greece, playing for that country in four Olympiads from 1996 to 2002. His request to again represent Serbia & Montenegro was granted by FIDE on 5 October 2005.

Miladinović was co-winner along with Joël Lautier, winning his individual game against the latter in the 6th edition of the strong invitation tournament Sigeman & Co. at Malmö 1998.

He won the 46th edition of the traditional Reggio Emilia chess tournament 2003/04 outright.

Miladinović later returned to Serbia and is affiliated with the Serbian Chess Federation.

He once was married to Woman Grandmaster Anna-Maria Botsari.

References

External links

1974 births
Living people
Chess grandmasters
Serbian chess players
Yugoslav chess players
Greek chess players
World Junior Chess Champions
Chess Olympiad competitors